The alveolar nerves or dental nerves include three superior alveolar nerves: the anterior superior alveolar nerve, middle superior alveolar nerve, and posterior superior alveolar nerve,
and an inferior alveolar nerve.

The superior alveolar nerves are all branches of the maxillary nerve, which is the second branch of the trigeminal nerve.

The inferior alveolar nerve, which is small in length, is a branch of the mandibular nerve, which is the third branch of the trigeminal nerve.

See also 
 Anterior superior alveolar nerve (Anterior superior dental nerve)
 Middle superior alveolar nerve (Middle superior dental nerve)
 Posterior superior alveolar nerve (Posterior superior dental nerve)
 Inferior alveolar nerve (Inferior dental nerve)

References

Maxillary nerve
Mandibular nerve